.22 caliber, or 5.6 mm caliber, refers to a common firearms bore diameter of 0.22 inch (5.6 mm).

Cartridges in this caliber include the very widely used .22 Long Rifle and .223 Remington / 5.56×45mm NATO.

.22 inch is also a popular air gun pellet caliber, second only to the ubiquitous .177 caliber.

Rimfire 
.22-inch caliber rimfire variations include:

In production
 .22 Long, a cartridge predating the .22 LR, with the same case length but a lighter bullet
 .22 Long Rifle (LR), the most common cartridge type of this caliber, often referred to simply as ".22 caliber" or "22".
 .22 Long Rifle Extra Long (LR EX), a variant of .22LR with a longer casing but identical overall cartridge dimensions (see CCI Stinger)
 .22 Short, a cartridge used mostly in pocket pistols and mini-revolvers
 .22 Winchester Magnum Rimfire (WMR), a magnum cartridge that is longer and more powerful than the .22 LR
 .22 Winchester Rimfire (WRF), a cartridge originally introduced to provide higher velocity than the .22 LR

Obsolete
 .22 Extra Long, a cartridge predating the .22 LR, not offered commercially since 1935
 .22 Winchester Automatic, a cartridge specific to the Winchester Model 1903 rifle

Special-use
 .22 BB (Bulleted Breech cap), a low-velocity cartridge designed for indoor target shooting
 .22 CB (Conical Ball cap), a low-velocity cartridge designed for indoor target shooting

Centerfire 
.22-inch caliber centerfire cartridges include:
Metric
 5.56×30mm MINSAS, a cartridge for close-quarter battle use
 5.56×45mm NATO, an intermediate cartridge widely used in AR-15 style rifles
 5.7×28mm, a cartridge manufactured by FN Herstal
.22
 .22 Accelerator, a special loading of the .30-30, .308, and .30-06 cartridges that is manufactured by Remington
 .22 BR Remington, a wildcat cartridge commonly used in varmint hunting and benchrest shooting
 .22 CHeetah, a cartridge based on the Remington 308 BR, modified to .22 caliber
 .22 Eargesplitten Loudenboomer, a cartridge based on a .378 Weatherby Magnum case intended to deliver high muzzle velocity
 .22 Hornet (5.6×35mmR), a powerful cartridge variant introduced in 1930
 .22 Nosler, a cartridge introduced in 2017 intended for use in AR-15-style rifles
 .22 PPC, a firearm cartridge used primarily in benchrest shooting
 .22 Remington Jet, a cartridge designed for the Smith & Wesson Model 53 revolver
 .22 Savage Hi-Power (5.6×52mmR), a cartridge introduced by Savage in 1912 for use in the Savage Model 99 rifle
 .22 Spitfire (5.7mm Johnson), a cartridge introduced in 1963 for use in the .30 Carbine
 .22 TCM (22 Micro-Mag), a shortened .223 Remington case designed to load into standard 9mm pistol magazines
 .22 Winchester Centerfire (WCF), a cartridge introduced in 1885 for use in a Winchester single-shot rifle
 .22-250 Remington, a very high velocity cartridge
.220
 .220 Rook (.220 Long Centrefire), an obsolete British cartridge of the 1880s
 .220 Russian (5.6×39mm), a 7.62×39mm cartridge necked down to hold a 5.6 mm bullet
 .220 Swift (5.56×56mmSR), the first cartridge (1935) with a muzzle velocity of over 4,000 ft/s (1,200 m/s)
.221
 .221 Remington Fireball, a special cartridge for use in the experimental XP-100 pistol (1963)
.222
 .222 Remington, the first commercial rimless .22 (5.56 mm) cartridge made in the United States (1950)
 .222 Remington Magnum, a short-lived commercially-produced cartridge derived from the .222 Remington
 .222 Rimmed, an Australian cartridge of the 1960s for single-shot rifles
.223
 .223 Remington, a commercial cartridge developed for the ArmaLite AR-15, from which the 5.56×45mm NATO cartridge was derived
 .223 Winchester Super Short Magnum (WSSM, 5.56×42mm), a cartridge based on the Winchester Short Magnum case
.224
 .224 Boz, a cartridge developed in the late 1990s, intended to defeat body armor
 .224 Valkyrie (5.6×41mm), a cartridge similar to the 5.56×45mm NATO, with a shorter case length
 .224 Weatherby Magnum (5.56×49mmB), a cartridge developed in 1963 for use in the Weatherby Varmintmaster rifle
 .224-32 FA, a cartridge designed in 2009 for use in the Freedom Arms Model 97 revolver
.225
 .225 Winchester, a replacement for the .220 Swift cartridge, introduced in 1964

See also
.223 Wylde chamber, a hybrid rifle chamber designed to allow .22 caliber barrels to safely fire either .223 Remington or 5.56×45mm NATO
5 mm caliber
22 (number)
Snake shot
 22 (disambiguation)

Pistol and rifle cartridges